The 2017 Meath Intermediate Football Championship is the 91st edition of the Meath GAA's premier club Gaelic football tournament for Intermediate graded teams in County Meath, Ireland. The tournament consists of 18 teams, with the winner going on to represent Meath in the Leinster Intermediate Club Football Championship. The championship starts with a group stage and then progresses to a knock out stage.

The draw for the group stages of the championship were made on 6 March 2017 with the games commencing on the weekend of 20 May 2017.

Bective were promoted to the middle grade after a 16-year exodus when securing the J.F.C. crown in 2016.

This was Ballinlough's return to the Intermediate grade after just 2 years as a senior club since being relegated in 2016.

On 22 October 2017, Curraha won their first ever Meath Intermediate Football Championship by beating St. Michael's 1-17 to 1-7 in the final in Páirc Tailteann. 2017 was only Curraha's second season at intermediate level since winning the 2015 Meath Junior Football Championship. 2018 will be their first ever period as a senior club.

Ballivor were relegated to the 2018 Meath Junior Football Championship after 6 seasons in the middle tier of Meath football.

Team changes
The following teams have changed division since the 2017 championship season.

From I.F.C.
Promoted to S.F.C.
 St. Colmcille's - (Intermediate Champions)

Relegated to 2017 J.F.C.
 Cortown

To I.F.C.
Relegated from 2016 S.F.C.
 Ballinlough

Promoted from 2016 J.F.C.
 Bective - (Junior 'A' Champions)

Participating teams
The teams taking part in the 2017 Meath Intermediate Football Championship are:

Group stage
There are 3 groups called Group A,B and C. The 2 top finishers in each group and the third-place finisher in Group A will qualify for the Quarter Finals. The third placed teams in Group B and C will qualify for a Preliminary Quarter Final, with the winner earning a place in last eight. The bottom finishers of each group will qualify for the Relegation Play Off.

The draw for the group stages of the championship were made on 8 February 2016 with the games commencing on the weekend of 20 May 2017.

Group A

Round 1
 Dunderry 1-17, 2-12 Drumbaragh, Pairc Tailteann, 20/5/2017,
 Trim 0-18, 0-12 Longwood, Kildalkey, 20/5/2017,
 Ballinlough 2-11, 0-16 St. Michael's, Kilmainhamwood, 21/5/2017,

Round 2
 Ballinlough 1-10, 0-9 Drumbaragh, Millbrook, 24/7/2017,
 St. Michael's 1-14, 1-13 Trim, Bohermeen, 25/7/2017,
 Dunderry 0-12, 0-10 Longwood, Kildalkey, 25/7/2017,

Round 3
 Ballinlough 1-9, 0-10 Longwood, Kildalkey, 11/8/2017,
 St. Michael's 2-16, 0-8 Drumbaragh, Carnaross, 11/8/2017,
 Dunderry 0-11, 0-11 Trim, Athboy, 15/8/2017,

Round 4
 Trim 2-14, 1-6 Drumbaragh, Athboy, 27/8/2017,
 St. Michael's 1-15, 1-14 Longwood, Athboy, 27/8/2017,
 Ballinlough 0-14, 0-11 Dunderry, Cortown, 28/8/2017,

Round 5
 Drumbaragh 3-8, 1-13 Longwood, Trim, 9/9/2017,
 Trim 1-11, 1-10 Ballinlough, Pairc Tailteann, 10/9/2017,
 St. Michael's 1-10, 0-11 Dunderry, Cortown, 10/9/2017,

Group B

Round 1
 Ballinabrackey 1-12, 0-12 Bective, Longwood, 19/5/2017,
 Curraha 0-14, 1-9 Kilmainham, Castletown, 19/5/2017,
 Castletown 3-16, 0-7 Ballivor, Kilmainham, 20/5/2017,

Round 2
 Bective 1-12, 2-7 Ballivor, Pairc Tailteann, 11/6/2017,
 Kilmainham 0-13, 0-11 Ballinabrackey, Pairc Tailteann, 23/7/2017,
 Castletown 2-14, 0-19 Curraha, Bective, 25/7/2017,

Round 3
 Bective 5-12, 0-16 Castletown, Pairc Tailteann, 13/8/2017,
 Curraha 2-15, 2-12 Ballinabrackey, Dunsany, 13/8/2017,
 Kilmainham 1-13, 1-13 Ballivor, Athboy, 13/8/2017,

Round 4
 Curraha 1-11, 1-11 Bective, Skryne, 24/8/2017,
 Kilmainham 2-13, 0-12 Castletown, Moynalty, 25/8/2017,
 Ballinabrackey 3-16, 1-6 Ballivor, Longwood, 26/8/2017,

Round 5
 Curraha 2-15, 0-6 Ballivor, Seneschalstown, 10/9/2017,
 Kilmainahm 2-8, 0-10 Bective, Bohermeen, 10/9/2017,
 Ballinabrackey 1-10, 0-7 Castletown, Athboy, 10/9/2017,

Group C

Round 1
 Walterstown 1-11, 0-10 St. Ultan's, Kilberry, 19/5/2017,
 Oldcastle 3-11, 2-6 Syddan, Carnaross, 20/5/2017,
 Nobber 2-12, 1-15 Donaghmore/Ashbourne 'B', Duleek, 20/5/2017,

Round 2
 Nobber 5-9, 2-13 Walterstown, Pairc Tailteann, 9/6/2017,
 Oldcastle 0-11, 1-8 Donaghmore/Ashbourne 'B', Kilmainham, 10/6/2017,
 St. Ultan's 0-15, 0-10 Syddan, Pairc Tailteann, 11/6/2017,

Round 3
 Donaghmore/Ashbourne 'B' 4-6, 1-14 Walterstown, Slane, 11/8/2017,
 Oldcastle 2-13, 1-8 St. Ultan's, Kilmainham, 11/8/2017,
 Syddan 1-12, 0-12 Nobber, Drumconrath, 13/8/2017,

Round 4
 Nobber 4-12, 4-7 St. Ultan's, Ballinlough, 24/8/2017,
 Syddan 3-11, 2-14 Donaghmore/Ashbourne 'B', Pairc Tailteann, 26/8/2017,
 Oldcastle 2-11, 0-14 Walterstown, Pairc Tailteann, 27/8/2017,

Round 5
 Oldcastle 2-10, 1-13 Nobber, Moynalty, 9/9/2017,
 Walterstown 2-9, 1-12 Syddan, Castletown, 9/9/2017,
 Donaghmore/Ashbourne 'B' 0-14, 1-9 St. Ultan's, Duleek, 9/9/2017,

Knock-out Stages

Relegation Play Off
The three bottom finishers from each group qualify for the relegation play off and play each other in a round robin basis.
The team with the worst record after two matches will be relegated to the 2018 Intermediate Championship.

 Game 1: Longwood 0-11, 1-6 Ballivor, Boardsmill, 23/9/2017,
 Game 2: St. Ultan's 1-12, 0-15 Ballivor, Athboy, 8/10/2017,
 Game 3: St. Ultan's 1-21 1-11 Longwood, Grangegodden, 22/10/2017

Knock-out Stages

Finals
The winners and runners up of each group qualify for the quarter finals along with the third-placed finisher of Group A.

Preliminary Quarter-Final:
 Nobber 0-10, 0-9 Ballinabrackey, Skryne, 16/9/2017,

Quarter-Finals:
 Curraha 1-13, 0-9 Donaghmore/Ashbourne 'B', Ratoath, 23/9/2017,
 St. Michael's 1-12, 0-12 Kilmainham, Moynalty, 23/9/2017,
 Oldcastle 2-13, 1-8 Trim, Ballinlough, 24/9/2017,
 Nobber 0-17, 1-11 Ballinlough, Carlanstown, 24/9/2017,

Semi-Finals:
 St. Michael's 3-14, 1-9 Nobber, Pairc Tailteann, 6/10/2017,
 Curraha 1-12, 2-7 Oldcastle, Pairc Tailteann, 7/10/2017,

Final:
 Curraha 1-17, 1-7 St. Michael's, Pairc Tailteann, 22/10/2017,

Leinster Intermediate Club Football Championship

Quarter Final:
 O'Connell's (Louth) 0-12, 2-7 Curraha, Castlebellingham, 4/11/2017,

Semi-Final:
 Ballyboughal 3-7, 0-15 Curraha, Ballyboughal, 18/11/2017,

References

External links

Meath Intermediate Football Championship
Meath Intermediate Football Championship